Hogan Township is one of fourteen townships in Dearborn County, Indiana. As of the 2010 census, its population was 1,178 and it contained 474 housing units.

History
Hogan Township was organized in 1852.

Geography

Unincorporated towns
 Mount Sinai
 Wilmington

Major highways
  Indiana State Road 350

Cemeteries
The township contains one cemetery, Carbaugh.

Education
Hogan Township residents may obtain a library card at the Aurora Public Library in Aurora.

References
 
 United States Census Bureau cartographic boundary files

External links
 Indiana Township Association
 United Township Association of Indiana

Townships in Dearborn County, Indiana
Townships in Indiana
Populated places established in 1852
1852 establishments in Indiana